The Kagghamraåns sjösystem is a system of lakes in Stockholm county, Södermanland, Sweden.

Lakes
The lake system comprises the following lakes:

Lakes of Stockholm County